Richard Balam (fl. 1653), was an English mathematician.

Balam was the author of Algebra, or the Doctrine of composing, inferring, and resolving an Equation (1653). It is a possible source of developments in John Wallis, Mathesis Universalis (1657), relating to geometric progressions treated as an axiomatic theory.

References

17th-century English mathematicians
17th-century English writers
17th-century English male writers